The Vaux Bridge is a future pedestrian and cycle footbridge planned for construction over the River Wear in Sunderland. It will link the city's Vaux Site with the adjacent area of Monkwearmouth and the Stadium of Light. The bridge was confirmed to be part of a £500 million redevelopment deal to Sunderland City announced in November 2019 by Legal & General.

In March 2021, a £31 million planning application for the new bridge was approved, which is anticipated to be completed by 2023.

References

North East England
City of Sunderland
Tourist attractions in the City of Sunderland
Bridges across the River Wear
Bridges in Tyne and Wear
Transport in the City of Sunderland
Pedestrian bridges in England
Proposed buildings and structures in England